In ancient Egypt, men who married to princesses became king. Most of the time, they have to be one of royal members to get marriage to princesses. 

Queen of Egypt may refer to:

Great Royal Wife, the ancient queens of Egypt
List of ancient Egyptian royal consorts
Any of the female pharaohs of Egypt, such as Hatshepsut or Cleopatra
List of consorts of the Muhammad Ali dynasty, the modern queens of Egypt

See also
Egyptian Queen, a 1969 painting by Frank Frazetta